Dinoponera snellingi (named after Roy Snelling) is a queenless species of ants in the subfamily Ponerinae. The species is known only from type locality in Campo Grande, Brazil.

Description
Workers are unknown.

Male specimens of this species are distinct in several respects. The combination of a bicolored body and head possessing bulging compound eyes and ocelli is unique to this species. More definitive is the shape of the aedeagus which possesses a large ventral lobe and finger-like serrated flange. The short broad digitus volsellaris with finely toothed basal lobe is distinctive, as well as the paramere shape.

References

Ponerinae
Insects described in 2013
Hymenoptera of South America